As a nickname, Hoppy may refer to:

 Jocelyn Lee Hardy (1894–1958), British Army major
 Jeff Hopgood (1948–2006), Australian rules footballer
 John Hopkins (political activist) (1937–2015), British photographer and counter-culture activist/instigator
 Richard Hopkins (civil servant) (1880–1955), British civil servant
 Roy M. Hopkins (1943–2006), American politician
 George F. Hopkinson (1896–1943), British Army major-general
 Ozell Jones (1960–2006), American basketball player
 Hoppy Kamiyama (born 1960), Japanese keyboardist and music producer
 Ernesto Rossi (gangster) (1903–1931), American gangster, early associate of Al Capone

See also 

Lists of people by nickname